Daniel O'Neill (1933 - 8 January 2015) was an Irish Gaelic footballer. His league and championship career at senior level with the Mayo and Louth county teams lasted a decade from 1953 until 1963.

Born in Castlebar, County Mayo, O'Neill first played competitive Gaelic football with the Castlebar Mitchels club. He was just eighteen-years-old when he won the first of four successive county senior championship medals in 1951. O'Neill later played with several clubs in the Drogheda area of County Louth after moving there for work purposes. After rejoining the Castlebar Mitchels club in Mayo, he won a fifth county senior championship medal in 1963. O'Neill finished his club career with Fr. Griffins in Galway.

O'Neill first appeared on the inter-county scene as a member of the Mayo junior team. He won a Connacht medal in that grade in 1953, before making his senior debut during the 1953-54 league. O'Neill won a Connacht and National League medals with the team, however, a dispute with the Mayo County Board over expenses saw him walk away from the Mayo team in 1956. Shortly after this he joined the Louth senior team and won a set of All-Ireland and Leinster medals in 1957. After several years playing for Louth, O'Neill returned to Mayo and played his final game for the team in 1963.

Honours
Castlebar Mitchels
Mayo Senior Football Championship (5): 1951, 1952, 1953, 1954, 1963

Mayo
Connacht Senior Football Championship (1): 1955
National Football League (1): 1953-54
Connacht Junior Football Championship (1): 1953

Louth
All-Ireland Senior Football Championship (1): 1957
Leinster Senior Football Championship (1): 1957

References

1933 births
2015 deaths
Castlebar Mitchels Gaelic footballers
Garda Síochána officers
Louth inter-county Gaelic footballers
Mayo inter-county Gaelic footballers
People from Castlebar